Hueytown is a city near Bessemer in western Jefferson County, Alabama, United States. It is part of the Birmingham metropolitan area, and was part of the heavy industry development in this area in the 20th century. At the 2020 census, the population was 16,776.

It was the home of the famous NASCAR Alabama Gang. It made international headlines in 1992 with the unexplained "Hueytown Hum", a mysterious noise believed to be related to large ventilation fans used for an underground coal mine in the area.

Its nearby residential and business communities were damaged by an F5 tornado on April 8, 1998 and by an EF4 tornado on April 27, 2011.

Geography 
This city is located at  (33.437709, -86.997579).

It is accessible from I-20/59 exits 112 and 115.

Demographics

2000 census
As of the census of 2000, there were 15,364 people, 6,155 households, and 4,517 families residing in the city. The racial makeup of the city was 83.81% White, 15.49% Black or African American, 0.14% Native American, 0.13% Asian, 0.08% from other races, and 0.34% from two or more races. 0.47% of the population were Hispanic or Latino of any race.

There were 6,155 households, out of which 29.5% had children under the age of 18 living with them, 57.8% were married couples living together, 12.3% had a female householder with no husband present, and 26.6% were non-families. 23.9% of all households were made up of individuals, and 10.9% had someone living alone who was 65 years of age or older. The average household size was 2.47 and the average family size was 2.92.

In the city, the population was spread out, with 22.2% under the age of 18, 8.6% from 18 to 24, 27.6% from 25 to 44, 24.4% from 45 to 64, and 17.2% who were 65 years of age or older. The median age was 39 years. For every 100 females, there were 90.2 males. For every 100 females age 18 and over, there were 86.4 males.

2010 census 
As of the census of 2010, there were 16,105 people, 6,412 households, and 4,517 families residing in the city. The racial makeup of the city was 70.0% White, 27.2% Black or African American, 0.3% Native American, 0.5% Asian, 1.1% from other races, and 1.0% from two or more races. 2.0% of the population were Hispanic or Latino of any race.

There were 6,412 households, out of which 27.5% had children under the age of 18 living with them, 50.4% were married couples living together, 15.7% had a female householder with no husband present, and 29.6% were non-families. 26.4% of all households were made up of individuals, and 11.3% had someone living alone who was 65 years of age or older. The average household size was 2.49 and the average family size was 2.99.

In the city, the population was spread out, with 22.3% under the age of 18, 7.8% from 18 to 24, 26.0% from 25 to 44, 27.4% from 45 to 64, and 16.5% who were 65 years of age or older. The median age was 40 years. For every 100 females, there were 89.5 males. For every 100 females age 18 and over, there were 92.2 males.

2020 census

As of the 2020 United States census, there were 16,776 people, 5,707 households, and 4,029 families residing in the city.

Economy 
The median income for a household in the city was $41,225, and the median income for a family was $49,380. Males had a median income of $36,087 versus $26,025 for females. The per capita income for the city was $19,735. About 5.3% of families and 6.8% of the population were below the poverty line, including 5.2% of those under age 18 and 9.2% of those age 65 or over.

Industrial history 
Although the Hueytown area has a history of farming, it has been a part of both the steel and coal mining industries in Jefferson County.

William & Joseph Woodward formed The Woodward Iron Company on New Year's Eve, 1881.  With William as company president and Joseph as company secretary, the brothers purchased the plantation of Fleming Jordan. The plantation had originally been developed by his father, Mortimer Jordan, in 1828.  The plantation included portions of present-day Hueytown and was one of the largest cotton plantations in the area.

On the former site of Mrs. Jordan's rose garden, Woodward Furnace No. 1 began operation on August 17, 1883.  A second furnace went into blast in January, 1887 and the two furnaces had a daily output of 165 tons.  A mine also went into operation in the Dolomite community, which is today mostly within the City of Hueytown.  By 1909, there was a third furnace and a daily capacity of 250,000 tons with a workforce of 2000 men on the payroll.

By the 1920s Woodward Iron's many expansions made it one of the nation's largest suppliers of pig iron. Joseph's son, A. H. (Rick) Woodward, had become Chairman of the Board of Woodward Iron, and was one of the most prominent citizens of Alabama.  He is probably best remembered as the owner of the Birmingham Barons minor league baseball team and the namesake of Rickwood Field, the nation's oldest professional baseball park still in use.

In 1968, Mead Corporation acquired Woodward Iron just as the steel industry was going into decline.  In 1973, the last blast furnace closed, and Koppers Corporation bought the remaining coke production plant.  Eventually, even Koppers had closed coke production as well. Much of the  site today has been re-developed for lighter industrial use.

Coal mining began about the start of the 20th century at Virginia Mines.  Today this section of Hueytown contains mostly subdivisions of homes (Virginia Estates and Edenwood).  However, some of the original buildings from its mining past remain, including the superintendent's house, multiple supervisors' houses, and two company-built churches.

Some source say veteran prospector Truman H. Aldrich assembled these lands as part of his extensive coal properties, others cite two red-headed brothers, George and E. T. Shuler, as having opened the Virginia Mine in 1902. Having recently arrived from Virginia City, Nevada, they named their new mine after that western city.  A mine disaster in February 1905 caused extensive damage. An underground explosion, one of the worst recorded mining disasters in Alabama history, entombed the entire day crew and caved in the mine entrance. When rescuers finally cleared the 1 shaft, they found 106 men dead and 20 dead mules.

In 1936, Republic Steel purchased the mine. It continued to be worked until September 1953, when it closed permanently.

Government 
The City of Hueytown was incorporated on May 6, 1960, and operates under a Mayor-Council form of government.  The Mayor is elected to a four-year term.  The five City Council members are also elected to four-year terms.  Originally elected at-large, the city changed to single-member districts in the 1990s which resulted in the creation of one majority-minority council district.  Neither position is term-limited.

Mayor C.C. "Bud" Newell died in office.  The President of the City Council, Gerald Hicks, was then elevated to the position of Mayor and completed the remaining years of the term.

The original Alderman for the City of Hueytown in 1960 were as follows:

 J. P. Campbell
 Prude T. Cowen, Sr.
 Myrtle T. Durrett
 David N. Kornegay
 R. G. Wall

Listed below is a partial list (alphabetical) of former members of The City Council who were not otherwise members of the original Council.

 Richard Autry
 Allan Brown
 Ken Burns
 Gerald Bush
 Phillip Contorno (2004-2020)
 John Linden Cox (1976–1980)
 Phifer Crane (2004-2020)
 Neil Ferguson
 Jimmy Forrester
 Georgia Grey Hampton
 Gerald Hicks
 Brad Hinton (1984–1988)
 Lillian P. Howard
 JoAnn Logan (the first minority member ever elected to the Council)
 Carole Marks
 Raleigh Rheuby
 Lewis Robertson
 Ray Robertson (2004-2016)
 Howard Segars
 J. B. Skates (1976–1980)
 Charles Young

Schools and education history 
The Hueytown area has been served by many schools over the past one hundred years.  Most of these have been public schools of The Jefferson County School System which was founded in 1898. However, the first established school in the community was in August, 1874, when several families gathered to build a small log building that served as both a church and school.  That structure was located on the hill behind present-day Pleasant Ridge Baptist Church.  A later grammar school was built on Upper Wickstead Road, but burned down in 1907.  The following year, Hueytown Grammar School opened with just four teachers for its 100 students.  Also located across the street from Pleasant Ridge Baptist Church it faced Dabbs Avenue.  The school was replaced with a larger building in 1935 which faced Hueytown Road.  That entire structure burned to the ground on the night of March 3, 1949. The present Hueytown Elementary School, which has been expanded many times, first opened in the fall of 1950.

The present Hueytown Intermediate School opened to the students in the fall of 2020.(November 2 or 9)

Other schools serving the city include: Hueytown High School, Hueytown Middle School (formerly Pittman Middle School and Pittman Junior High), Concord Elementary School and North Highland Elementary School. Four private religious schools, Deeper Life Academy, Garywood Christian School, Brooklane Baptist Academy, and Rock Creek Academy are located in Hueytown.

Other schools that served Hueytown in years past have long since been closed.  They included Virginia Mines School, Rosa Zinnerman Elementary, and Bell High School. When an F5 tornado destroyed Oak Grove High School and Oak Grove Elementary School on April 8, 1998 students from the Oak Grove high school grades were temporarily relocated to the former Bell School campus until their new school reopened two years later.

Recently the Hueytown High School Marching, Symphonic, and Jazz Bands have gained some prestige by playing at the Alabama Music Educators Association (AMEA) and a dual concert with the University of Alabama at Birmingham's Symphonic and Wind ensembles.
 The Hueytown High School mascot is the Golden Gophers, which came from the Minnesota Golden Gophers National Championship football team, which won the National Championship in 1960, the same year Hueytown was incorporated.

Sports and recreation 
The abbreviation HYT (HueYTown) has become a popular term of reference for Hueytown among some of the residents; it is constantly used for sports. (for example HYT football).

Hueytown High School's football team made it to the Alabama State Playoffs in 1974, 1975, 1995, and 2004.  They also made the playoffs in 2006, 2007, and 2008, marking the first time in school history to make three straight appearances.  The 2010 team set a school record for wins by going 11–2, but the record was broken the next year by Jameis Winston and company by going 13–1. On June 18, 2009 Hueytown High School's football Coach Jeff Smith resigned. Spain Park High School assistant coach Matt Scott became the new head coach on July 7, 2009. The team made the playoffs once again in the 2010 and 2011 season under Coach Scott. Hueytown also made it to the 2016 state playoffs under Coach Scott Mansell, who was in his third year as head coach.

HHS's softball team has won the Alabama State Softball championship three times in four years: 2005 and 2006 as a 5A school and 2008 as a 6A school under Coach Lissa Walker. They won again in 2011 as a 5A school. After the 2011 season, Coach Walker resigned and was hired as the new coach for the Vestavia softball team. Coach Christie McGuirk was hired in Coach Walker's place to be the new coach for the 2011 season.

In 1974, the Hueytown High School Wrestling Team won the 4A State Championship under the guidance of then head-wrestling coach, Tony Morton.

Hueytown High School implemented its soccer program in the spring of 2014.

In addition to the public school sports programs, Hueytown offers many other community sports programs.  For decades the city has enjoyed a very strong Dixie Youth Baseball program for all eligible age groups.  Its Dixie Youth teams use facilities at Hueytown's Bud Newell Park and have seen several of its players eventually make it to the Major Leagues.  The city also has a very strong girls fastpitch program that is based at Allison-Bonnett Girls Softball Park, also a city facility.  Its Angels league All-Star team won the Dixie World Series championship in the summer of 2003 and its 6U All-Stars won the Alabama State Championship in the summer of 2009.  Hueytown also has a Swim Club and a youth football program.

Hueytown also has Youth Soccer which started in 2003.

Hueytown is also home to the Central Alabama Boys & Girls Club, a multimillion-dollar facility that provides a variety of sports and recreation opportunities for the youth of the area, focusing primarily on after school and summer programs.  It routinely serves more than 300 children each day.

The Alabama Gang 
Hueytown was home to one of the dominant racing groups in NASCAR, the Alabama Gang. The city's main thoroughfare, Allison-Bonnett Memorial Drive, takes its name from drivers Bobby Allison, Donnie Allison, Davey Allison, Clifford Allison, and Neil Bonnett.  The Alabama Gang also includes racing legend Charles "Red" Farmer. Though not considered a member of The Alabama Gang, Bobby and Donnie's older brother Eddie Allison had an active role in NASCAR for many years as a respected engine builder and still resides in Hueytown. His son, Jacob, is a radio personality on Birmingham, Alabama station WJOX. He also resides in Hueytown.
 Bobby and Donnie Allison were originally from the Miami, Florida area; another member, Red Farmer, was a Nashville, Tennessee native but had raced in the Miami area before moving to Hueytown.

Because of its established motorsports roots, Hueytown was chosen as BMW Motorsport's initial North American base of operations before its first season with the International Motor Sports Association (IMSA) in 1975.

Hueytown Hum 
Beginning in late 1991 residents of Hueytown, and other nearby communities, reported hearing a droning low frequency hum at irregular intervals. The bizarre noises momentarily gained national attention and were reported in The New York Times in April, 1992.  In a logical conclusion town officials and many residents suspected the source of the hum was a massive $7 million mine ventilation fan with blades  in diameter.
From local reports and an informal investigation by ABC World News Tonight, the fan operated by Jim Walter Resources, Inc. was generally thought to be the culprit. However, JWR (then owned by a subsidiary of Kohlberg Kravis Roberts) was in bankruptcy proceedings and denied its fan was the source. Following an inconclusive series of studies the hum subsided later in the year, never to return.

Notable people 

 Bobby Allison, former NASCAR driver
 Davey Allison, late NASCAR driver
 Donnie Allison, former NASCAR driver
 Neil Bonnett, late NASCAR driver
 Russ Davis, baseball player
 Red Farmer, NASCAR and short track driver
 Jimmy Kitchens, former NASCAR driver
 Mark Waid, writer
 Jolynn Wilkinson, ARCA driver

References

External links 
 
 Hueytown Information Site

Cities in Alabama
Cities in Jefferson County, Alabama
Birmingham metropolitan area, Alabama